Prasit Kotmaha (Thai: ประสิทธิ์ โคตรมหา) is a Thai retired footballer.

External links
Profile at Thaipremierleague.co.th
https://int.soccerway.com/players/prasit-kotmaha/73309/

1979 births
Living people
Prasit Kotmaha
Prasit Kotmaha
Association football goalkeepers
Prasit Kotmaha